William, Bill, or Billy Holmes may refer to:

Sports
 Bill Holmes (ice hockey) (William Orser Holmes, 1899–1961), Canadian ice hockey player
 Bill Holmes (footballer, born 1926) (1926–2020), English footballer
 Billy Holmes (footballer, born 1875) (1875–1922), English footballer with Manchester City who became manager of Clapton Orient
 Billy Holmes (footballer, born 1951) (1951–1988), English footballer with Hereford United, Wimbledon and other clubs
 Billy Holmes (Australian footballer) (1890–1942), Australian footballer for Collingwood and Fitzroy
 William Holmes (English cricketer) (1885–1951), English cricketer
 William Holmes (New Zealand cricketer) (1849-1885), New Zealand cricketer
 William Holmes (cyclist) (born 1936), British Olympic cyclist
 William Holmes (footballer) (1889–1933), footballer who played for Stoke

Politicians
 Bill Holmes (trade unionist) (1873–1961), British Labour Party politician and trade unionist
 William Holmes (politician) (1779–1851), British Tory politician

Military
 William Holmes (Australian general) (1862–1917), Australian Major General of World War I
 Sir William Holmes (British Army officer) (1892–1969), British Lieutenant General of World War II
 William Edgar Holmes (1895–1918), English recipient of the Victoria Cross
 William Holmes (British Army medical officer) (1762–1834), Surgeon-General to the British Forces in Canada
 William Norman Holmes (1896–?), World War I flying ace
 William T. Holmes (1846–1916), Union Army soldier in the American Civil War and Medal of Honor recipient

Others
 William Holmes (academic) (1689–1768), Vice-Chancellor of Oxford University 1732–1735
 William Holmes (actor), American actor 
 William Holmes, anarchist writer and husband of Lizzie Holmes
 William Holmes (film editor) (1904–1978), American film editor
 William Hardy Holmes (1873–1951), Anglican bishop
 William Henry Holmes (1846–1933), American anthropologist
 William Henry Holmes (musician) (1812–1885), English musician
 William E. Holmes (1856–1931), Baptist minister and educator
 William Anthony Holmes (1782–1843), Irish clergyman

See also
 William à Court-Holmes, 2nd Baron Heytesbury (1809–1891), British peer and Conservative MP